Gedaylu (also Romanized as Gedāylū; also known as Gedāylī) is a village in Aslan Duz Rural District, Aslan Duz District, Parsabad County, Ardabil Province, Iran. At the 2006 census, its population was 587, in 95 families.

References 

Towns and villages in Parsabad County